The  singles Tournament at the 2005 Banka Koper Slovenia Open took place in mid-September on outdoor hard courts in Portorož, Slovenia.

Klára Koukalová emerged as the winner.

Seeds

Draw

Finals

Top half

Bottom half

References

2005 Singles
Banka Koper Slovenia Open - Singles